Paige Spara is an American actress best known for her main roles as Audrey Piatigorsky in the ABC Family sitcom Kevin from Work and Lea Dilallo in the ABC medical drama The Good Doctor.

Early life
Spara was born in Washington, Pennsylvania, the daughter of hair-salon owner Kevin and dental hygienist Kim Spara.  She is the middle child with an older sister Taylor and younger brother Jesse.  She began acting at the age of 12 when she joined Kids' Theater Works.  She continued acting at Washington High School where she graduated in 2008.  From there, she honed her craft at Pittsburgh Community Theater and Irondale Theater in New York City.

Spara attended Point Park University in Pittsburgh for two years where she studied acting before transferring to Marymount Manhattan College where she earned a degree in theater performance in 2012.

Before landing any film or television roles, she was a guide for a Gossip Girl bus tour in New York City and was filmed as a greeter and her image was projected as a hologram welcoming visitors and travelers to Washington Dulles International Airport in Dulles, Virginia.  After graduating from university, she moved to Los Angeles and spent two years auditioning before landing Kevin from Work.

Career
Following roles in short films Prospect Street in 2010 and What Showers Bring and After the Hurricane in 2014, Spara's first main role came in 2015 as Audrey Piatigorsky in the ABC Family sitcom Kevin from Work, the co-worker to Noah Reid's Kevin Reese Daly. The show ran for 10 episodes until it was officially canceled that same year.

In 2017, Spara had a small role as a bartender in Home Again starring Reese Witherspoon.

Shortly after, she was cast in a recurring role in the ABC medical drama The Good Doctor as Lea Dilallo, the best friend and love interest and future wife of the protagonist Shaun Murphy (played by Freddie Highmore). Spara was promoted to the main cast for the show's second season.

In 2017, Spara had a role in Lauv’s music video "I Like Me Better". In 2020, Spara directed and had a role in Sidny X Chaix's video "Just Friends."

Other projects
Before landing her first television role of Audrey Piatigorsky on Kevin from Work, she appeared in commercials for Forevermark Jewelry, Sally Hansen nails, and Volkswagen Golf.  Recently, Spara has been working on a podcast entitled The Inbetween.

Filmography

References

External links

Living people
21st-century American actresses
Actresses from Pennsylvania
American film actresses
American people of German descent
American people of Italian descent
American people of Polish descent
American people of Scottish descent
American television actresses
Marymount Manhattan College alumni
People from Washington, Pennsylvania
Point Park University alumni
American music video directors
Year of birth missing (living people)